Charles Adam Pannell Jr. (born January 24, 1946) is a senior United States district judge of the United States District Court for the Northern District of Georgia.

Education and career

Born in DeKalb County, Georgia, Pannell received an Artium Baccalaureus degree from the University of Georgia in 1967 and a Juris Doctor from the University of Georgia School of Law in 1970. He was in the United States Army Reserves in the Judge Advocate General's Corps from 1971 to 1997. He was an Assistant United States Attorney of the Northern District of Georgia from 1971 to 1972, and in private practice in Georgia from 1972 to 1976. He was a special assistant attorney general of the State of Georgia from 1974 to 1976, and then a district attorney of Georgia's Conasauga Judicial Circuit from 1977 to 1979. He was a Superior court judge of the Conasauga Judicial Circuit from 1979 to 1999.

Federal judicial service

On July 14, 1999, Pannell was nominated by President Bill Clinton to a seat on the United States District Court for the Northern District of Georgia vacated by Frank M. Hull. Pannell was confirmed by the United States Senate on October 15, 1999, and received his commission on October 26, 1999. Pannell assumed senior status on January 31, 2013.

References

Sources

1946 births
Living people
Assistant United States Attorneys
Georgia (U.S. state) state court judges
Judges of the United States District Court for the Northern District of Georgia
People from DeKalb County, Georgia
Superior court judges in the United States
United States district court judges appointed by Bill Clinton
United States Army colonels
University of Georgia alumni
University of Georgia School of Law alumni
20th-century American judges
21st-century American judges
District attorneys in Georgia (U.S. state)
United States Army Judge Advocate General's Corps
United States Army reservists